Lukáš Milo (born October 19, 1983 in Vitkov) is a track and field sprint athlete who competes internationally for the Czech Republic.

Milo represented the Czech Republic at the 2008 Summer Olympics in Beijing. He competed at the 100 metres sprint and placed 5th in his heat without advancing to the second round. He ran the distance in a time of 10.52 seconds.

References

1983 births
People from Vítkov
Living people
Czech male sprinters
Olympic athletes of the Czech Republic
Athletes (track and field) at the 2008 Summer Olympics
Sportspeople from the Moravian-Silesian Region